Tarzan, Lord of the Jungle is an American animated series created by the Filmation studio for Saturday mornings on CBS, starting in 1976. This was the first animated series about the jungle hero. There are 36 episodes produced over four seasons.

Opening-credits narration
"The jungle: Here I was born; and here my parents died when I was but an infant. I would have soon perished, too, had I not been found by a kindly she-ape named Kala, who adopted me as her own and taught me the ways of the wild. I learned quickly, and grew stronger each day, and now I share the friendship and trust of all jungle animals. The jungle is filled with beauty, and danger; and lost cities filled with good, and evil. This is my domain, and I protect those who come here; for I am Tarzan, Lord of the Jungle!"

Storyline
In many ways, the series is the most faithful of all screen-based adaptations of Edgar Rice Burroughs's Tarzan and featured a number of "lost cities" from the original novels. The rotoscoped animation is based upon the work of Burrough's favorite Tarzan artist, Burne Hogarth.

In the series, Tarzan is depicted as intelligent and well-spoken – not the simple-minded ("Tarzan... Jane") caricature of many films. His sidekick is N'kima the monkey, as in the novels ("Cheeta" the chimpanzee was the creation of movie producers). It uses much of Burroughs' Mangani language (though some of the words used, particularly for animals not encountered in the novels, do not appear in Burroughs' Mangani lexicons, and so were presumably newly invented for the show).

Characters

 Tarzan (voiced by Robert Ridgely for speaking voice and Danton Burroughs for Tarzan yell) – The main protagonist.
 N'kima (voiced by Lou Scheimer) – Tarzan's manu (monkey) companion.
 Jad-bal-ja – A golden-furred, dark-maned lion raised and trained by Tarzan.
 Tantor – African Elephants that are friendly towards Tarzan, and will also come to his aid if summoned.
 Queen Nemone (voiced by Joan Gerber in the first appearance, Hettie Lynn Hurtes in the third appearance) – The ruler of Zandor who has had encounters with Tarzan.
 Tomas (voiced by Alan Oppenheimer) – Queen Nemone's prime minister who does her bidding.
 Belthar – Queen Nemone's pet lion.
 Phobeg (voiced by Ted Cassidy in the first appearance, Alan Oppenheimer in the third appearance) – The strongest man in Zandor and member of Zandor's Royal Guards. In Phobeg's first appearance, Tarzan must fight him in a tournament. Tarzan managed to defeat him and Phobeg later frees him and Thia. Phobeg has since remained a secret ally of Tarzan when it comes to Queen Nemone's plots. In "Tarzan and the Soul Stealer", it is shown that Phobeg has a son named Tiborgh who assists his father in working in Zandor's Royal Guards.
 Jane Porter (voiced by Linda Gary) – Tarzan's love interest in the original novels, she only appeared once during the Filmation series. In "Tarzan and Jane", she and her father were part of an archaeological expedition looking for the lost city of Cowloon and were accompanied back to civilization by Tarzan.

Fictional races
 Mangani – A type of great ape. They are intelligent, with their own spoken language (which Tarzan knows), are Tarzan's friends and family, and will come to his aid if summoned. Named Mangani include Terkoz (voiced by Lou Scheimer) and Tor. Kala was only seen in the intro of this cartoon.
 Bolmangani – A race of gorilla-men. They take monkeys, normal gorillas, and other animals to be used as slaves in plots to enhance their city and to take over the entire jungle. They have fought Tarzan many times and have been thwarted by him. They try to get revenge on him so thwarting their plots. 
 Donlumangani – A race of short humanoid primates that live in the snowy mountains. They are nicknamed the Ice People.
 Monkey People – A race of creatures that are part human, part monkey.

Other animals
Almost all of the animals in the Filmation series are referred to using the Mangani-language names that Tarzan knows them by.

 Argus – A giant eagle
 Bazansi – A spider
 Bolgani – A Gorilla
 Borta – A Common Warthog
 Buto – A Black Rhinoceros
 Dimetrodon – a reptile from the inner world of Pellucidar and the land of Pal-ul-don
 Dango – A Spotted Hyena
 Duro – A Hippopotamus
 Eta-pamba - A Kangaroo rat
 Gimla – A Crocodile
 Gordo – An aquatic beast resembling a sauropod
 Gorgos – An African Buffalo
 Gryf – A dinosaur-like creature in Pal-ul-don that is described by Tarzan as "ancient". It resembles a Triceratops with the dorsal plates and spiked tail of a Stegosaurus and teeth like a Tyrannosaurus.
 Handal – A hornet
 Histah – An African Rock Python
 Lukota – A giant tortoise
 Manu – A monkey. N'kima is one.
 Nita – A hawk
 Numa – A Lion
 Pacco - A Zebra
 Plesa – A fish
 Sabor – A lioness
 Sheeta – A large jungle cat
 Tandor - The Pellucidar name for the Woolly Mammoth
 Tangani – A baboon
 Tarbogani – A white gorilla
 Tar-Sheeta – A large white tiger that lives in the snowy mountains
 Thipdar - The Pellucidar name for the Pteranodon
 Zabor - The Pellucidar name for the Tyrannosaurus
 Zupisa – A great whale

Episode list
There were 36 total episodes, produced over four seasons.

The first season (premiered September 11, 1976) consisted of 16 half-hour episodes. The second season (premiered September 10, 1977) added six new episodes, and aired with the half-hour series The New Adventures of Batman as The Batman/Tarzan Adventure Hour. The third season (premiered September 9, 1978) added six new episodes, and aired with a number of other series as the ninety-minute Tarzan and the Super 7. The fourth season (premiered September 15, 1979) added eight new episodes, and aired as part of the second season of Tarzan and the Super 7.

The "fifth season" (The Tarzan/Lone Ranger Adventure Hour), and the "sixth season" (The Tarzan/Lone Ranger/Zorro Adventure Hour) were all Tarzan reruns aired with other series.

Season 1: 1976

Season 2: 1977
Aired as part of The Batman/Tarzan Adventure Hour.

Season 3: 1978
Aired as part of Tarzan and the Super 7, season one.

Season 4: 1979
Aired as part of Tarzan and the Super 7, season two.

Cast
 Robert Ridgely – Tarzan
 Jack Bannon –
 Erika Carroll –
 Ted Cassidy – Phobeg (1st time)
 Robert Chapel –
 Gerald Clark –
 Linda Gary – Jane Porter, Dr. Jessica Randolph, Fana the Huntress, Rowanda, Queen Tara
 Joanie Gerber – Queen Nemone (1st Time)
 Barry Gordon – Bjorn
 Hettie Lynn Hurtes – Thia, Queen Nemone (3rd Time)
 Alan Oppenheimer – Tomos, Orbin, Phobeg (3rd Time)
 Jane Webb –

Formats
Tarzan, Lord of the Jungle (September 11, 1976 – September 3, 1977, CBS)
The Batman/Tarzan Adventure Hour (September 10, 1977 – September 2, 1978, CBS)
Tarzan and the Super 7 (September 9, 1978 – September 6, 1980, CBS)
The Tarzan/Lone Ranger Adventure Hour (September 13, 1980 – September 5, 1981, CBS)
The Tarzan/Lone Ranger/Zorro Adventure Hour (September 12, 1981 – September 11, 1982, CBS)

Home media
The series does not appear in the Universal Television library, and the rights are owned by the Edgar Rice Burroughs company. Warner Home Video has released one episode on DVD, "Tarzan and the Colossus of Zome", on Saturday Morning Cartoons: 1970s Volume 1; Warner Bros.' rights to the series may originate from their ownership of international TV distribution rights in the 1970s and 1980s. Ironically, Warner has released most of the Tarzan franchise it owns either through its Turner Broadcasting subsidiary or in-house.

The first season of the series was released on DVD on June 14, 2016 as part of its 40th anniversary.

References

External links
 Tarzan, Lord of the Jungle at SkoolDays.com
 
 
 
 
 
 
 Tarzan Movie Guide: Television Series 1966 – Present

1976 American television series debuts
1980 American television series endings
American children's animated action television series
American children's animated adventure television series
American children's animated fantasy television series
CBS original programming
1970s American animated television series
Animated Tarzan television series
Animated television series about orphans
Television series by Filmation
Television series by Warner Bros. Television Studios